Klaus Murbræch (born 13 January 1975) is a retired Norwegian football striker.

He played youth football for Søgne IL. He made his debut for IK Start in 1993, and also played a couple of games in the 1994 Eliteserien, but without scoring. In 1996 he went on loan to FK Vigør. After one season in Ullern IF he left that club ahead of the 1998 season.

Murbræch became a physician and took the PhD degree in 2017 with the thesis Cardiovascular status in long term survivors of lymphomas and malignant ovarian germ cell tumors.

References

1975 births
Living people
People from Søgne
Norwegian footballers
IK Start players
FK Vigør players
Ullern IF players
Eliteserien players
Norwegian First Division players
Association football forwards
Norway youth international footballers
21st-century Norwegian physicians
University of Oslo alumni